Vierhouten may refer to:

Vierhouten, village in Nunspeet, Netherlands
Aart Vierhouten (born 1970), Dutch cyclist